The New Zealand Army rugby team of 1919 was a rugby union team which represented New Zealand after the end of the First World War. Although spoken of as a single team, there were several New Zealand Services teams playing in Britain at the conclusion of the War. The most notable being the touring Army XV who played a series of games throughout Great Britain and France, including an internationally recognised match against the Wales national team. With the introduction of the King's Cup; a services tournament between forces from Australia, Britain, Canada, New Zealand and South Africa, the team split intself in two. The 'A' Team taking part in the King's Cup, while the 'B' team continued touring against club and county opponents.

New Zealand Services
The First World War saw a high percentage of amateur rugby union players signing up to serve their country. At the same time the sport of rugby union was suspended at club and country level in most countries. The sport survived during this period through organised games conducted by inter-service and allied forces.

When the War came to an end, most international and club teams were decimated; more than a hundred internationals had died in the conflict (See:List of international rugby union players killed in action during the First World War), many more were seriously injured and other players were now too old or out of condition. Therefore, club teams took the possibility to play an organised New Zealand team as a way to challenge their own teams as they sought to rebuild.

Llanelli's first official game after the War was against the New Zealand Army team from the Larkhill Garrison in Wiltshire. This was followed by games against the New Zealand Machine Gun Corps on 22 February 1919. These and similar teams came together to make the New Zealand Army team. This team split into an 'A' and 'B' team when during a tour of Great Britain, an inter-services tournament, with a cup presented by King George V, was held between the allied forces. The stronger New Zealand Army 'A' team took the challenge of the King's Cup and eventually triumphed over the British Army at Twickenham. The 'B' team continued the tour of Great Britain and France.

The tour of Great Britain and France
The tour of Great Britain and France took in 38 matches, of which the New Zealand Army won 33, drew two and lost just three games. With the tour over the Army team headed to South Africa for a further twelve matches.

Touring party
Those players marked with AB were also capped as New Zealand 'All Black' rugby union internationals, either before or after playing in the New Zealand Army team.

Full-backs
 C.H. Capper (Field Artillery)
 John Gerald O'Brien (Divisional Signals)AB

Three-quarters
 W.A. Ward (Rifle Brigade)
 Percival Wright Storey (Otago Infantry Regiment)AB
 G.L. Owles (Field Artillery)
 Leonard "Jack" Stohr (Medical Corps)AB
 Edmond Ryan (Field Artillery)AB

Five-eighths
 Eric Arthur Cockroft (Canterbury Infantry Regiment)AB
 Richard William Roberts (Rifle Brigade)AB
 William Fea (Rifle Brigade)AB
 Jim Ryan (Otago Infantry Regiment)AB
 W.L. Henry (Canterbury Infantry Regiment)
 P. Tureia (Pioneers)
 G.J. McNaught (Machine Gun Corps)
 E. Watson (Wellington Infantry Regiment)
 G. Yardley (Auckland Infantry Regiment)

Half-backs
 Charlie Brown (Field Engineers)AB
 D.McK. Sandman (Canterbury Infantry Regt.)

Forwards
 P. Allen (Wellington Infantry Regt.)
 J. Kissick (Field Engineers)
 F.P. Arnold (Auckland Infantry Regt.)
 A.A. Lucas (Field Artillery)
 Ernest Bellis (Otago Infantry Regt.)AB
 Jim Moffitt (Auckland Infantry Regt.)AB
 R.W. Bilkey (Field Artillery)
 Harold Vivian Murray (Machine Gun Corps)AB
 John Alexander Bruce (Field Engineers)AB
 E.J. Naylor (Otago Infantry Regt.)
 Michael Joseph Cain (Otago Infantry Regt.)AB
 R. Sellars (Divisional Signals)
 Eric Cockroft (Field Artillery)AB
 Arthur Singe (Auckland Infantry Regt.)
 James Burt Douglas (Otago Infantry Regt.)AB
 S.J. Standen (Field Artillery)
 Dick Fogarty (Rifle Brigade)AB
 C.W. Tepene (Otago Infantry Regt.)
 A. Gilchrist (Field Artillery)
 Alfred West (Field Artillery)AB
 Edward Hasell (Field Artillery)AB
 H.G. Whittington (Rifle Brigade)
 Ranji Wilson (Rifle Brigade)AB

Results

1 The matches that made up the King's Cup competition.

New Zealand Army in Wales
During the First World War, the ban on players who had switched to play professional rugby league from playing rugby union was lifted. This allowed players from both codes to play in services teams without threat of action. With the war over, the Welsh Rugby Union immediately sought to re-establish the amateur rules, and were suspicious that several of the New Zealand team had played professional rugby before the war and now wanted a guarantee that all the New Zealanders were amateurs. This view led one irate British Service officer to comment, "As if it matters a damn whether they are amateurs or professionals when they have come to this country to fight and die for us." The WRU, realising that they had misjudged public sentiment towards the Services teams, quickly dropped their complaint and did not raise the issue again.

Wales

Wales: Ianto Davies (Maesteg), Jerry Shea (Pill Harriers), Melbourne Thomas (Bridgend), Evan Rees (Swansea), Trevor Nicholas (Cardiff). Walter Martin (Newport), Ike Fowler (Llanelli), Glyn Stephens (Neath) capt., Jim Jones (Swansea), William Havard (Llanelli), Gwyn Francis (Llanelli), Jack Whitfield (Pill Harriers), Aaron Rees (Swansea), Will Morris (Abertillery), Tom Parker (Swansea)
New Zealand Army: C Capper, W Ford, L Stohr, P Storey, J Ryan capt., W Fea, C Brown, M Cain, E Hassell, J Kissick, J Moffitt, A Wilson, A West, A Singe, R Fogarty

The King's Cup
The King's Cup was contested by six teams. The New Zealand Army, the British Army (known during the competition as the Mother Country), Australian Imperial Forces, Canadian Expeditionary Forces, South African Forces and the RAF.

The competition, sometimes referred to as the 'Inter-Services and Dominions Rugby Championship', consisted of a small league, whereby each of the teams played each other over a period of weeks. Once the teams had played each encounter, the two sides with the most wins would face each other for the right to play for the King's Cup at Twickenham. The winner of the final was then invited to play the French Army team, again at Twickenham. The matches were played in varying locations around Britain.

The New Zealand Army 'A' team's first encounter was with the RAF played at Swansea in Wales; New Zealand won 22–3. This was followed by another victory, this time against the Canadian Force at Portsmouth in England. After beating the South African Forces team at Twickenham, New Zealand travelled to Edinburgh in Scotland to play the 'Mother Country', the British Army team. This was the closest encounter to date, with New Zealand winning 6–3. With four wins from four encounters, New Zealand had already secured their place in the final, but then lost the final match of the round against Australia at Bradford. This was the first loss of the tour for the New Zealand Army, for either the A or B team.

The final in London was between New Zealand and the 'Mother Country' team. James Ryan led his team to a 9–3 victory, earning the right to Face the French Army three days later. After the win over France, Ryan was award the King's Cup, presented by King George V. With the King's Cup Championship over, the 'A' team returned to Wales to rejoin the rest of the squad ready to face the Wales team at Swansea.

Bibliography

Notes

External links 
 
 

New Zealand Army
New Zealand Army
tour
tour
tour
tour
tour
Military sports teams